Asclepias sanjuanensis, the San Juan milkweed, is a species of milkweed native to northwestern New Mexico.  This species is restricted to the Four Corners area and is only present in San Juan County in New Mexico.

Distribution 
Asclepias sanjuanensis is endemic to the Four Corners Region in San Juan County, NM. Habitat comprises mostly in sandy or sandy loam soils in pinyon-juniper woodlands and Great Basin grassland communities. Known populations occur from 5,000 to 6,200 ft. elevation. Often in disturbed sites.

References 

sanjuanensis
Flora of New Mexico